Neotridactylus apicialis, known generally as larger pygmy mole cricket, is a species of pygmy mole cricket in the family Tridactylidae. Other common names include the larger pygmy locust and larger sand cricket. It is found in North America and South America.

References

External links

 

Tridactylidae
Articles created by Qbugbot
Insects described in 1825